The Chair is an American comedy drama streaming television series created by Amanda Peet and Annie Julia Wyman. It is set at the fictional Pembroke University, "in what seems like New England". The series was released on Netflix on August 20, 2021. In January 2023, The Chair was canceled after one season.

Plot 
Professor Ji-Yoon Kim is the newly appointed chair of the English department at Pembroke University. The first woman chosen for the position, she attempts to ensure the tenure of a young black colleague, negotiate her relationship with her crush, friend, and well-known colleague Bill Dobson, and parent her strong-willed adopted daughter.

Cast and characters

Main

 Sandra Oh as Ji-Yoon Kim, the new English department chair at Pembroke University
 Jay Duplass as Bill Dobson, Kim's friend and colleague who is a mess after his wife died and his daughter left for college
 Bob Balaban as Elliot Rentz, a senior faculty member of the English department
 Nana Mensah as Yaz McKay, a young faculty member of English department who is up for tenure
 Everly Carganilla as Ju-Hee "Ju Ju" Kim, Ji-Yoon's adopted daughter
 David Morse as Paul Larson, a dean at Pembroke University who oversees the English department
 Holland Taylor as Joan Hambling, a senior faculty member of the English department

Recurring

 Ji Lee as Habi, Ji-Yoon's father
 Ron Crawford as Professor McHale, a senior faculty member of the English department
 Ella Rubin as Dafna Eisenstadt, an English student
 Mallory Low as Lila, Dobson's teaching assistant
 Jordan Tyson as Capri
 Simone Joy Jones as Joy
 Marcia Debonis as Laurie, the English department chair's assistant
 Bob Stephenson as IT Support technician
 Cliff Chamberlain as Ronny

Guest
 David Duchovny as Himself (in "The Last Bus in Town")

Episodes

Production 
The Chair was created by Amanda Peet and Annie Julia Wyman. Peet also served as an executive producer, alongside David Benioff, D. B. Weiss, Bernie Caulfield, Daniel Gray Longino, and Sandra Oh. Peet and Annie Julia Wyman co-wrote the pilot episode. Washington & Jefferson College in Washington, Pennsylvania, and the Shadyside campus of Chatham University in Pittsburgh were used to represent Pembroke University, with the Shadyside neighborhood standing in for the town of Pembroke.

Reception
On the review aggregator website Rotten Tomatoes, the series holds an approval rating of 86% based on 69 critic reviews, with an average rating of 6.9/10. The website's critics consensus reads, "The Chair is too short to achieve all of its ambitions, but spot-on observations about academia and a sturdy ensemble led by an empathetic—and hilarious—performance from Sandra Oh ensure it's never less than watchable." Metacritic gave the series a weighted average score of 73 out of 100 based on 33 critic reviews, indicating "generally favorable reviews".

Reviewing the series for USA Today, Kelly Lawler gave the series a rating of three out of four stars and said, "Like most college students, The Chair is incredibly ambitious at what it will achieve in its short time and occasionally falls flat, but overall the series beats the metaphorical curve." 

Ben Travers of IndieWire gave the series a B and wrote, "If The Chair were just a collegiate-level romantic-comedy, it would be a delight, boosted further by its brevity, but the show's eagerness to cover more ground is both exciting and a bit much."

References

External links
 
 

2021 American television series debuts
2021 American television series endings
2020s American college television series
2020s American comedy-drama television series
2020s American workplace comedy television series
2020s American workplace drama television series
English-language Netflix original programming
Television shows set in New England
Television shows filmed in Pennsylvania
Television shows filmed in Pittsburgh
Television series about educators
Works about academia